Zasavica I, also known as Zasavica or Gornja Zasavica, is a village in the Sremska Mitrovica municipality, in Serbian province of Vojvodina. The village has a Serb ethnic majority and its population numbering 772 people (2011 census).

Geography

The village is located 12 km south-west of Sremska Mitrovica, on the river Zasavica. Although part of the Srem District, Zasavica I is situated in the region of Mačva south of the Sava river. It is one of several settlements in the northern section of the region of Mačva which were administratively included into the province of Vojvodina when it was created in 1945. With the adjacent village of Zasavica II (Donja Zasavica), it still forms a single cadastral unit, although they are treated as separate villages for census purposes.

Gallery

Historical population

1961: 1,775
1971: 1,673
1981: 924
1991: 864
2002: 836
2011: 772

See also
List of cities, towns and villages in Vojvodina

References

External links 
 
Municipality of Sremska Mitrovica

Populated places in Vojvodina
Sremska Mitrovica
Mačva